AMF Bowling Pinbusters! is a bowling sports-based video game.

Gameplay

The Wii controller allows the player to mimic real bowling by using typical bowling movements.  The game environment offers mirrored balls, hot neon lights, and strobe effects. Several mini-games are available such as Obstacles and Pool Bowl.

Players can choose from eight unique characters, such as the Surfer, the Drill Sergeant, Punk Rock Girl, the Cowgirl, and the Rapper – each with their own personality.

Development
The DS version of the game was announced in April 2008. The game was released for the N-Gage on June 17, 2009.

Reception

The DS version received "mixed" reviews, while the Wii version received "unfavorable" reviews, according to the review aggregation website Metacritic.

One common complaint was that the latter console version lacked an option to play left-handed. IGN complained about the Wii version's offensive stereotypes and terrible gameplay, and pointed out that Wii Sports had a better bowling simulation for free. GamesRadar+ said of the same console version, "It is, as a whole, considerably worse than what is one-fifth of Wii Sports - in look, execution and enjoyment."

See also
 List of Wii games

References

External links
 Official Website for Wii Version
 
 

2007 video games
Bethesda Softworks games
Bowling video games
IOS games
Nintendo DS games
Nintendo Wi-Fi Connection games
Video games developed in the United Kingdom
Wii games
Atomic Planet Entertainment games
Mud Duck Productions games
Vir2L Studios games